Cheshmeh Sorkheh Seyyed Reza (also Romanized as Cheshmeh Sorkheh Seyyed Rez̤ā) is a village in Afrineh Rural District, Mamulan District, Pol-e Dokhtar County, Lorestan Province, Iran. In accordance with the 2006 census, its population was 97, in 27 families.

References 

Towns and villages in Pol-e Dokhtar County